Li Wenhai (born ) is a veteran Singaporean actor. He has acted in various Singaporean television dramas.

Career 
In 1981, Li joined Singapore Broadcasting Corporation (SBC). In August 1991, after filming Jealousy Potion 100, Li applied to have an early termination to his acting contract with SBC and to transfer to the voice dubbing department. After eight months, in April 1992, he resigned from SBC.

After leaving SBC, Li opened a shop with friends selling Buddhist equipment at Balestier Shopping Center. The shop was eventually closed down in 1988 after the shop lease had finished and business was poor. Li was then invited by the producer and writer of Riding the Storm to act in the drama.

He left Media Corporation of Singapore (rebranding of SBC) in 2003 due to migraine.

In 2004, Li joined SPH MediaWorks.

Filmography

TV series 

 1982

 Mother's Birthday Present 一束花
 Evening Breeze 晚来风急

 1983

 Double Blessings 春风得意 as Li Ming Feng 李明峯
 Endless Knots 情结
 All that Glitters is Not Gold 捷径
 A Breakfast Story 早餐的故事
 CID '83 狮城勇探 as Johnson Wu Johnson吴

 1984

 Spice of Life 四日谈 之《花圃的秘密》 as Bi Wen's Father 碧纹父亲
 The Awakening 雾锁南洋 之《狮城拂晓》 as Zhao Zi Liang 赵子良
 Blossoms in the Sun 阳光蜜糖 as Wu Tian Sheng 吴天生
 The Awakening 2 雾锁南洋II–风雨同舟/赤道朝阳
 Pursuit 怒海萍踪 as Cheng Han 成汉

 1985

 The Unyielding Butterflies 铁蝴蝶 as Huang Ji Ze 黄季泽
 The Young Heroes 少年英雄 as Hui Tian Yu 惠天宇

 1986

 Men of Valour 盗日英雄传 as Zhang Bao 张保
 The Samsui Women 红头巾 as A-Long 阿龙
 Crossroads 红绿灯 之《绿影》 as Du Sen 杜森
 The Bond 天涯同命鸟 as Chuan Qi Yi Fu 川崎一夫
 The Sword and the Song as Li Yu 李煜

 1987

 Fury of the Dragon 冷月剑无言 as Xie Meng 谢猛
 Strange Encounters 奇缘 之《辗转红尘》、《阴差阳错》 as Zha Kang Nian, Jin Gong Zi 查康年、金公子

 1988

 Airforce 空军 as Lu Wen Biao 陆文彪
 The Last Applause 舞榭歌台 as Ma Duan Cheng 马端成
 Mystery 迷离夜 之《梦》、《谜》 as Wei Xing 韦信
 Strange Encounters 2 奇缘2 之《阴阳妻》 as Wen Bu Ting 温布庭

 1989

 A Long Way Home 燃烧岁月 as Zheng Wei Ting 郑伟庭
 Return of the Prince 丝路迷城 as Yi Bei Da Shi 一杯大师

 1990

 Navy 壮志豪情 as Zhang Zhao Hua 张兆华
 The Winning Team 飞跃巅峰 as Fang Zhi Hui 方志晖

 1991

 Behind Bars 铁狱雷霆 as Lawyer 律师

 1999

 From the Medical Files 2 医生档案II as Li Yu Feng 李裕丰
 Stepping Out 出路 as Chen Jia Geng 陈嘉庚
 Hero of the Times 新方世玉

References

Year of birth missing (living people)
Living people
20th-century Singaporean male actors
Singaporean people of Chinese descent
21st-century Singaporean male actors
Singaporean male television actors